Electric City may refer to:

Places 
 Electric City, Washington, U.S.
 Anderson, South Carolina, U.S., nicknamed Electric City 
 New France, Digby County, Nova Scotia, Canada, nicknamed Electric City
 Schenectady, New York, U.S., nicknamed Electric City  
 Scranton, Pennsylvania, U.S., nicknamed Electric City
 Electric City Trolley Museum, a Scranton trolley museum
 Kaukauna, Wisconsin, U.S., nicknamed Electric City
 Peterborough, Ontario, Canada, nicknamed Electric City
 Great Falls, Montana, U.S., nicknamed Electric City
 Brora, Sutherland, Scotland, nicknamed the Electric City

Media
 Electric City (web series), a 2012 web series published online by Yahoo
 Electric City of Music Instructor
 "Electric City" (song), by the Black Eyed Peas
 "Electric City" (The Big O episode)

Other
 Electric City FC, a Canadian soccer team located in Peterborough, Ontario

See also
 Electricity (disambiguation)
 Electric (disambiguation)
 City Electric
 Electric Town